Todd R. Moore (born ) is a United States Space Force brigadier general who is the deputy commander of the Space Training and Readiness Command.

Education 
 Lower Merion High School
 1995 Bachelor of Science, Business Administration in Finance and Management, University of Delaware, Newark
 2001 Master of Business Administration, University of Colorado, Colorado Springs
 2002 Squadron Officer School, Maxwell Air Force Base, Ala.
 2007 Strategic Policy Intern, Pentagon, Washington D.C.
 2013 Master of Arts, National Security and Strategic Studies, United States Naval War College, Newport, R.I.

Assignments 

1. May 1996–February 1997, Student, Undergraduate Space & Missile Training, Vandenberg Air Force Base, Calif.
2. March 1997–June 1999, Satellite Operator & Operations Engineer, 4th Space Operations Squadron, Schriever
AFB, Colo.
3. July 1999–July 2003, Instructor & Deputy Flight Commander, 534th Training Squadron, Vandenberg AFB, Calif. 
4. August 2003–May 2005, Air Force Intern, Headquarters U.S. Air Force, Pentagon, Washington D.C.
5. June 2005–June 2007, Flight Commander & Assistant Director of Operations, Data Masked
6. July 2007–June 2008, Executive Officer to the Deputy Director, National Reconnaissance Office, Chantilly, Va.
7. July 2008–May 2010, Operations Officer, 3rd Space Experimentation Squadron, Schriever AFB, Colo.
8. June 2010–June 2012, Squadron Commander, Space Operations Squadron, Aerospace Data Facility, Buckley
AFB, Colo. 
9. July 2012–June 2013, Naval War College, Newport R.I.
10. July 2013–May 2014, Chief, Space Branch, Joint Staff J6, Pentagon, Washington D.C.
11. June 2014–June 2015 Deputy Director, Joint Staff Mitigation Oversight Task Force, Washington D.C.
12. July 2015–July 2017, Commander, Air Force Element, RAF, Menwith Hill, England
13. July 2017–July 2019, Commander, 21st Space Wing, Peterson AFB, Colo.
14. July 2019–June 2020, Deputy Director, Space Security and Defense Program
15. June 2020–August 2021, Inspector General, Space Operations Command, Peterson SFB
16. August 2021–present, Deputy Commander, Space Training and Readiness Command, Peterson SFB

Personal life 
In June 1999, Moore married Kelly Zachocki.

Awards and decorations 
Moore is the recipient of the following awards:

Dates of promotion

References 

Living people
Year of birth missing (living people)
Place of birth missing (living people)
United States Space Force generals